Michael Scott (born 1955) is an American film director, producer and documentary filmmaker. He is best known as producer and film director for Dangerous Lies (2020 film), Cedar Cove (2013), Trading Christmas (2011),The Most Wonderful Time of the Year (2008) and other films.

Background
Michael M. Scott was raised in Mexico City, Mexico, the adopted son of Winston Scott, a U.S. intelligence officer, and Paula Maev Scott, a native of Ireland. His father, Winston M. Scott (Winston Mackinley Scott) worked for the CIA during the Cold War in Mexico. In 1970, Michael and his brother George were sent to Connecticut. From 1970 – 1973, Michael Scott was a student at Taft School, a preparatory private school in Watertown, Connecticut. Michael Scott is a graduate of the Occidental College.

Filmmaking career
While still an undergraduate at Occidental College in 1975, Scott interviewed Clarence Carnes, an inmate who had done time on Alcatraz and was known to be the youngest inmate in the Federal prison. The interview resulted in documentary aired later on PBS. In 1980s, Scott began to work with Dave Bell Associates production company, where he produced HBO’s “Decoys,” a documentary about undercover cops in New York City. Scott made his directorial and writing debut with 1983's One Man's Fight for Life, – a story about a school teacher struggling with lung cancer.

Scott is credited as director and executive producer of the Netflix movie Dangerous Lies (2020 film) that premiered on May 30, 2020. In October 2020, the film was nominated for People's Choice Awards in the drama movie category.
Scott’s long term relationship with writer David Golden resulted in the spec thriller being picked up as a Netflix Original. Since 1983, Michael Scott has worked with a number of production and entertainment companies including Crown Media, Hallmark Channel, PBS, HBO, Netflix and more. Overall, Scott has over fifty credits as director and producer.

Michael Scott vs CIA
Scott’s father, Winston M. Scott, wrote a manuscript about his life titled, "It Came To Little" which was confiscated by James Jesus Angleton, the CIA's counter intelligence chief, shortly after Winston Scott’s death in 1971. The manuscript became the object of a Freedom of Information Act (FOIA) request that was denied, resulting in a lawsuit filed by Michael Scott (Scott vs CIA). A settlement with the CIA was reached in 1996. Later, Jefferson Morley, a veteran Washington journalist, collaborated with Scott and wrote "Our Man in Mexico", a biography of Winston M. Scott and CIA's operations in Mexico during the Cold War.

Filmography

See also
List of Hallmark Channel Original Movies
List of Cedar Cove episodes

External links
Michael Scott on IMDb

References

Living people
American film directors
American film producers
Occidental College alumni
1955 births